Subbanna R. Ekkundi (1923–1995) was a recipient of Sahitya Akademi Award, National Aaward for Teacher and Soviet Land Award.

Ekkundi was born in Ranebennur of Haveri district in the year 1923. His father was Ranganath and mother was Rajakka. He was a student of literature at Willingdon college, Sangli.  At Willingdon, V. K. Gokak and R. S. Mugali were Ekkundi's professors. Ekkundi and Gangadhar V. Chittal from Hanehalli were classmates at Willingdon. After graduating with B.A. (Hons.) Literature in the year 1944, Subbanna Ekkundi joined the Anandashram High School, Bankikodla as a teacher and retired as Head Master of that institute in 1977. Ekkundi was married to Indira Ekkundi from Haveri.

In 1992, Ekkundi was awarded the Sahitya Akademi and the Karnataka Sahitya Akademi awards for his outstanding poetical work Bakulada Hoovugalu in Kannada. His poem Ladhak Irali Nepa Irali which was written during the Second Indo-China war was well received. His political sympathies were with the Communist party.  After his retirement, he was given a national award for teaching. He was the author of many works of poetry and short stories. His work is described by an entry in the Encyclopaedia of Indian Literature Besides politics, his poetry deals primarily with traditional Indian mythological and religious themes. His Ubhaya Bharati concerns the famous debate between the Hindu philosophers Adi Shankara and Mandana Mishra.

In 1970, Ekkundi was given award from the Land of the Soviets. Kannada University at Hampi conferred a PhD degree to a student on a thesis entitled S. R. Ekkundi....

An anthology of his complete poems was released in the year 2008 in a book titled Bellaki Hindu.

Collection of Poems

 Matsyagandhi (1975)
 Bakulada Hoovugalu (1991)
 Ubhaya Bharati
 Subhadra
 Ananda Teertha
 Mithile
 Kathan Kavanagalu
 Havadigara Huduga
 Bellakkigalu
 Santana
 Godhiya Tenegalu
 Parivallagalu 
 Bellakki Hindu (An Anthology of Complete Poems) 

Other Work

 Neralu (Collection of Short Stories)
 Eradu Russian Kadambrigalu'' – Translated from Russian to English to Kannada (fiction)
 Panjugalu

Awards

 Kendra Sahitya Akademi Award for Bakulada Hoovugalu
 Karnataka Sahitya Akademi Award for Bakulada Hoovugalu
 Karnataka Sahitya Akademi Honorary Award for Lifetime Achievement
 Best Teacher Award
 Vardhamana Award

References

External links 
 Ekkunid's Photo
 A poem by Ekkundi in Vishva Kannada

Kannada poets
Educators from Karnataka
1923 births
1995 deaths
People from Haveri district
Recipients of the Sahitya Akademi Award in Kannada
20th-century Indian poets
Poets from Karnataka
Kannada-language writers